Pheel Khana School is a Primary, Middle and High School in Ragho Majra area of walled Patiala fort.

The Pheel Khana School was founded in 1955 along with its sister institution Senior Model School, Civil Lines Patiala as part of a 'Model School' program of Government of Punjab.

The name Pheel Khana is derived from Persian word for "Elephant Farm" of Maharaja of Patiala; which was pulled down to erect the main building of the school. The Pheel Khana school campus adjoins the old city wall between Nabha Gate and Top Khana Gate. The wall is mostly gone, however many of the gates of old walled city of Patiala are still standing.

Pheel Khana School is affiliated with Punjab School Education Board and has enrolment of over 1200 students in classes from Nursery to 12th grade.

Principals
 S. Soni - 1955
 Shanta Razdan - 1955
 Manjit Kaur Pal - 1955
 Sarda Kaura - 1960
 Pritpal Singh - 1966
 Hem Lata Deol - 1968
 Jasmer Kaur Kang - 1977
 Vimal Sethi - 1980
 Perminder Bir - 1987
 S. P. Pandove - 1989
 Pushpa Dewan - 1990
 Mahinder Khanna - 1992
 Nirmal Kaur Chaddha - 1997
 Narinder Pal Mehta - 2004
 Amrik sir - 2007
 Darshan sir pathi sir - 2009
 S. Ajit Singh Bhatti 
 Karamjit Singh - 2013

See also
Punjab School Education Board

Photo gallery

External links

 Batchmates link
 Reunion of 1973 batch on Flickr.com

High schools and secondary schools in Patiala
1955 establishments in East Punjab
Educational institutions established in 1955